VGP may refer to:

 VGP JSC, a Ukrainian manufacturer of sanitary paper products
 VGP Universal Kingdom, an amusement park in Chennai, Tamil Nadu, India
 Vermont Green Party
 Vertebrate Genomes Project
 Verlagsgruppe Passau, a German publishing company; see Deník
 Vessels General Permit, related to ship pollution in the United States
 Virtual Geomagnetic Pole, see plate reconstruction